TicketNet is a computerized ticketing network for concerts, circus/ice show, sports events etc. exclusively for Araneta Coliseum and others. It has 31 outlets throughout the Philippines.

Araneta Coliseum is now called Smart Araneta Coliseum.

Entertainment companies of the Philippines
Companies based in Manila
Ticket sales companies